γ-Humulene synthase (EC 4.2.3.56, humulene cyclase) is an enzyme with systematic name (2E,6E)-farnesyl-diphosphate diphosphate-lyase (γ-humulene-forming). This enzyme catalyses the following chemical reaction

 (2E,6E)-farnesyl diphosphate  γ-humulene + diphosphate

References

External links 
 

EC 4.2.3